Zhu Yigui (1690–1722) was the leader of a Taiwanese uprising against Qing dynasty rule in mid-1721.

He came from a peasant family of Zhangzhou Hokkien ancestry and lived in the village of Lohanmen located in the area of modern-day Neimen District, Kaohsiung. There he worked raising ducks and was a respected member of the local community. In 1721 an earthquake wrought havoc to Lohanmen, even more the prefect of the island, not only kept collecting heavy taxes even among the impoverished people who lost their possessions with the earthquake.

Zhu was one of those who rose in rebellion and his good reputation among the locals gave him enough followers so that on 19 April he attacked and captured the city of Kua-chin-na (modern-day Gangshan). Other rebel leaders also rose on the island, and Qing authorities were heavily pressured. Hoklo, Hakka and Taiwanese aborigines rallied in revolt against the Qing authorities.

The Qing authorities retreated to Penghu. The rebel army continued its movement on the western coastal plains. On 1 May, Zhu took the title of Zhongxing Wang (中興王; "Reviving King") and the era name Yong He (永和; "Enduring Peace"), he also established an administration reminiscent of the Ming dynasty.

His power started to weaken after disputes with Du Junying, which spelled disaster for the rebels, as this occurred at the same time the Manchu government organized an expedition against them.

References

Further reading 

1722 deaths
17th-century births
People executed by the Qing dynasty
People from Zhangzhou
Qing dynasty people
Qing dynasty rebels
Taiwanese people of Hoklo descent
Year of birth uncertain
Generals from Fujian
Han Chinese
Military history of Taiwan
18th-century Taiwanese people